Mary Manning Howe Adams (30 June 1905 – 27 June 1999) was an Irish novelist, playwright and film critic.

Biography
Born and raised in Dublin, Ireland, Mary Manning got her theatre training in Sara Allgood's teaching class in the Abbey Theatre. She had gone to school in Morehampton House and Alexandra College, Dublin. She also worked as a writer for the Gate Theatre. She adapted the short story Guests of the Nation for a film directed by Denis Johnston. Manning also helped found the Dublin Film Society in 1930. She worked as a film critic and co-founded the Gate Theatre arts magazine Motley in 1932.

In 1935 Manning moved to Boston where she married Harvard Law School professor Mark De Wolfe Howe. They had three daughters Fanny, Susan and Helen. When her husband died Manning returned to Dublin in 1967 and lived in Monkstown, County Dublin for another ten years. During this time Manning wrote for various publications such as Hibernia, The Irish Times and The Atlantic. She later returned to live in Cambridge, Massachusetts.

Manning was a founder of the Poets' Theatre in Cambridge, Massachusetts and worked as drama director at Radcliffe College during World War II.

After Manning returned to the US she married Faneuil Adams of Boston, Massachusetts in 1980

Mary's death occurred on 27 June in the year of 1999; at the age of 93 years old.  Her death place was at the Mt Auburn hospital located in Cambridge, Massachusetts.

Ireland's two waves of silent film 
From 1914 to 1926, Ireland experienced a surge of new film styles being produced, consisting of historical melodramas and romantic comedies. Following this, 1930 to 1935 birthed a second wave of industry produced silent films that were intended to be less cliche compared to the first wave. The films produced under the second wave were much more experimental and dealt less with the commercial appeals of the first wave. There's minimal information on how Manning specifically contributed to the second wave, however, it is stated that she played an important role producing five out of the six films to come out of that wave.

Prior to her career as a writer and filmmaker, Mary Manning worked as a film critic throughout the 1920s and 30s. She worked as a film critic for the Irish Statesman for a year during that time until it went out of business. She was known to disapprove of Hollywood's "unimaginable stories and its stereotypical portrayal of Ireland and the Irish".

Bibliography

Writings 

 Adams, Bernard. Denis Johnston: A Life. Dublin: Lilliput, 2002.
 Advertisement. Irish Times (20 August 1930): 6.
 Irish Times (23 August 1930): 6.
 Irish Times (26 August 1930): 6.
 Irish Independent (23 August 1930): 8.
 Irish Independent (26 August 1930): 6.
 Barton, Ruth. Irish National Cinema. New York: Routledge, 2004.
 Casella, Donna R. “Women and Nationalism in Indigenous Irish Filmmaking of the Silent Period.” In Researching Women in Silent Cinema: New Findings and Perspectives. Eds. Monica Dall’Asta, Victoria Duckett, and Lucia Tralli. Bologna: University of Bologna, 2013. 53–80.
 “From Lantern to Slide Show.” Memories in Focus. Raidió Teilifís Éireann (RTÉ), Dublin. 27 April 1995. Television. IED, RTÉ.
 Howe, Fanny. Personal Interview. 10 July 2015.
 Howe, Susan. Personal Interview. 11 June 2015.
 "Irish Amateur Films." Irish Times. (26 August 1930): 6.
 “Irish Amateur Film Society.” Dublin Evening Mail (30 August 1930): 2.
 “Irish Productions Find Their Feet.” Memories in Focus. Raidió Teilifís Éireann (RTÉ), Dublin. 4 May 1995. Television. IED, RTÉ.
 "Irish Girl Makes Film Name.” The Sunday Chronicle (6 July 1930): n.p. Norris Davidson file, Liam O’Laoghaire Archives. NLI
 “Irish Playwright – Critic – Novelist Mary Manning Adams is Dead at 93. Obit. Playbill. 1 July 1999. http://www.playbill.com/news/article/irish-playwright-critic-novelist-mary-manning-adams-is-dead-at-93-82864
 Johnston, Denis. “3rd Omnibus X Book.” Denis Johnston Papers (MS 10066/181/95/194). TC
 Manning, Mary. "Dublin-Cum-Elstree." Irish Statesman (30 November 1929): 254–56.
 "The Fairchild Family at the Films.” Motley (November 1933): 12–14.
 "Hail Veidt!" Motley (March 1933): 10–12.
 “Mary Manning.” In Enter Certain Players: Edwards-MacLiammóir and the Gate 1928-1978. Ed. Peter Luke. Dublin: Dolmen Press 1978. 35–39.
 "A Silent Interlude." Irish Statesman (28 September 1929): 72–73.
 "The Voice of Ireland." Motley (February 1933): 14–15.
 "What is the Wild West Saying?” Irish Statesman (22 February 1930): 496–98.
 "Why Not a Repertory Cinema?" Motley (September 1932): 14–15.
 “Mark de Wolfe Howe Dies; Lawyer, Historian Was 60.” Obit. The Harvard Crimson. (1 March 1967) http://www.thecrimson.com/article/1967/3/1/mark-de-wolfe-howe-dies-lawyer/
 “Mary M. Adams, 93; Irish Novelist and Playwright.” Obit. The Boston Globe (27 June 1999): 7. 
 “Mary Manning Howe Adams.” Obit. Irish Times (8 July 1999): 19. 
 “Producing Films in Ireland.” Irish Independent (26 August 1930): 10.
 Programme, Guests of the Nation. 16 March 1960. Guests of the Nation clippings file. IED-TML
 Rockett, Kevin. “Part One: History, Politics and Irish Cinema.” In Kevin Rockett, Luke Gibbons and John Hill, Cinema and Ireland. London: Croom Helm, 1988. 1–126. 
 Rockett, Kevin and Emir Rockett. Irish Film and Television Research Online. 15 March 2012. http://www.tcd.ie/irishfilm/
 Trotter, Mary. Ireland’s National Theaters: Political Performance and the Origins of the Irish Dramatic Movement. Syracuse: Syracuse University Press, 2001.

Filmography 

 A. Archival Filmography: Extant Film Titles:
 1. Mary Manning as Actress, Adapter, Company Co-founder, and Miscellaneous Crew   By Accident. Dir.: J. N. G. (Norris) Davidson, asst. dir./casting: Mary Manning, sc.: Norris Davidson (Irish Amateur Films IE 1930) cas.: C. Clarke-Clifford, Olive Purcell, Mary Manning, Paul Farrell, si, b&w, 16mm. Archive: IED, RTÉ.
 2. Mary Manning as Adapter, Company Co-founder and Miscellaneous Crew  Guests of the Nation. Dir.: Denis Johnston, adp./props: Mary Manning (Denis Johnston Productions IE 1935) cas.: Barry Fitzgerald, Frank Toolin, Cyril Jackson, Charles Maher, Georgina Roper, Fred Johnson, Shelah Richards, Cyril Cusack, Hilton Edwards, si, b&w, 35mm. Archive: IED, GBB.
 3. Mary Manning as Company Co-founder and Miscellaneous Crew  Screening in the Rain. Cam.: J. N. G. (Norris) Davidson, misc. crew: Mary Manning (Irish Amateur Films IE 1930) cas.: Mary O’Moore, Grace McLoughlin, Judge Johnston, Lord Longford, Hilton Edwards, Micheál MacLiamóir, si, b&w (tinted), 16mm. Archive: IED, RTÉ.
 B. Filmography: Not Extant Film Titles:
 1. Mary Manning as Director and Company Co-founder  Bank Holiday, 1930.
 2. Mary Manning as Company Co-founder and Miscellaneous Crew  Pathetic Gazette, 1930.

Plays
 Go, Lovely Rose
 Youth's The Season...? (Published in Plays of Changing Ireland, edited by Curtis Canfield [New York: Macmillan, 1936].)
 Storm over Wicklow
 Happy Family
 The Voice of Shem: Passages from Finnegans Wake Freely Adapted for the Theatre (London: Faber & Faber, 1958)

Books
 Mount Venus
 Lovely People
 The Last Chronicles of Ballyfungus

References

Further reading
Casella, Donna. "Mary Manning." In Jane Gaines, Radha Vatsal, and Monica Dall’Asta, eds. Women Film Pioneers Project. Center for Digital Research and Scholarship. New York, NY: Columbia University Libraries, 2013. Web. 9 October 2015.

1905 births
1999 deaths
Irish women dramatists and playwrights
20th-century Irish novelists
20th-century Irish dramatists and playwrights
Irish women novelists
20th-century Irish women writers
Women film pioneers